Valeriy Andriyovych Blazhko (born 22 March 2001) is a professional Ukrainian footballer who plays as a forward for Metalist 1925 Kharkiv.

References

External links
 
 Profile on Metalist 1925 Kharkiv official website
 

2001 births
Living people
Footballers from Kharkiv
Ukrainian footballers
FC Metalist 1925 Kharkiv players
FC Kramatorsk players
Ukrainian First League players
Association football forwards
Ukrainian expatriate footballers
Ukrainian expatriate sportspeople in the Czech Republic
Expatriate footballers in the Czech Republic